Oswaldo "Ozz" Negri Jr. (born May 29, 1964) is a Brazilian racing driver from São Paulo.

Racing career

Formula Three and Indy Lights
He raced part-time in the British Formula Three Championship from 1987 to 1989 with few good results. He returned to his native Brazil in 1990 to race in Brazilian Formula Three Championship, where he won the championship, and Formula 3 Sudamericana where he finished 9th. With newfound confidence he returned to British F3 in 1992 and finished 4th. In 1993 he went to the Mexican Formula Three Championship and raced there until 1996. In 1997 he raced in Indy Lights part-time for Genoa Racing and finished 20th. In 1998 he won the Mexican version of Indy Lights, Indy Lights Panamericana. He made one Indy Lights start in 1999 and finished 3rd in Indy Lights Panamericana in 2000.

Grand-Am sports cars

Negri moved to sports car racing in 2003 racing in the Grand-Am Rolex Sports Car Series. He joined Michael Shank Racing and raced full-time in the series in 2004 and finished 12th in points, winning the league's rising star award which he shared with Max Angelelli. He captured his first victory in 2006 at Miller Motorsports Park and finished second in the 24 Hours of Daytona. He finished 8th in points in both 2006 and 2007. In 2008 he finished 10th, winning in the first race held at the New Jersey Motorsports Park. He stayed with the team in 2009 and finished 8th in points. In 2010 he finished 10th in points and in 2011 improved to a career-best sixth. He won the 24 Hours of Daytona in 2012 for Michael Shank Racing with teammates A. J. Allmendinger, John Pew, and Justin Wilson. It was his first Rolex Sports Car Series win since 2008.

Racing record

IMSA WeatherTech SportsCar Championship series results

* Season still in progress

24 Hours of Le Mans results

External links
 
 
 

1964 births
Living people
Racing drivers from São Paulo
Brazilian racing drivers
24 Hours of Daytona drivers
24 Hours of Le Mans drivers
Rolex Sports Car Series drivers
Indy Lights drivers
Mexican Formula Three Championship drivers
Formula 3 Sudamericana drivers
British Formula Three Championship drivers
Brazilian WeatherTech SportsCar Championship drivers
Stock Car Brasil drivers
European Le Mans Series drivers
Brazilian Formula Three Championship drivers
Meyer Shank Racing drivers
AF Corse drivers
Le Mans Cup drivers